The Soccer Writers Association of Ireland Personality of the Year is an annual award for the person considered to have made the most positive impact on the domestic League of Ireland season.

Instigated in 1961 - when Drumcondra's Dan McCaffrey was the winner - it is one of the few awards that can be given to either a player or manager. In fact, the recipient in 1964 was FAI secretary Joe Wickham.

The award is organised by the Soccer Writes' Association of Ireland.

Winners

References

Association footballers in the Republic of Ireland
Republic of Ireland association football trophies and awards
Association football player non-biographical articles